The Gus-class LCAC code Project 1205 Skat was a medium-sized assault hovercraft operated by the Soviet Navy from 1969 until the early 1990s.

Configuration 
The Gus class was a military version of the Soviet Skate class 50 passenger hovercraft, and was designed to transport infantry and light equipment. Between 1969 and 1974, 32 Gus-class assault hovercraft were constructed. They were deployed to all Soviet naval fleets except the Northern Fleet, and were used extensively along the Amur River border with China. All Gus-class hovercraft were believed scrapped in the early 1990s.

Capacity
The Gus class was capable of carrying up to 25 assault troops and their equipment.

See also
List of ships of the Soviet Navy
List of ships of Russia by project number

References 

 Sharpe, Richard (RN) Jane's Fighting Ships 1990-91 
  All Gus class LCAC - Complete Ship List

Amphibious warfare vessels of the Soviet Navy
Amphibious warfare vessels of the Russian Navy
Military hovercraft
Landing craft